Hernán Evaristo Medford Bryan (born May 23, 1968) is a Costa Rican former football player and coach. Highly regarded as one of the most important figures in the history of Central American football, Medford achieved success as both a player and a coach.

As a player, Medford is fondly remembered in Costa Rica for two historic goals, both of which he considers his favorite, while playing for Costa Rica: the winning goal of a group stage match against Sweden to qualify to the knockout stage, and the winning goal of the Aztecazo, Mexico's first defeat in a non-friendly match at the Estadio Azteca.

Numerous media outlets regard Medford as the most successful coach in Central America, as he also found massive success across the region, winning championships in Costa Rica, Honduras, and Guatemala. He also coached Saprissa to win the 2005 CONCACAF Champions' Cup, thus qualifying to the 2005 FIFA Club World Championship, finishing on the third place.

Playing career

Club
Nicknamed Pelicano, or Pelican, Medford made his league debut for Sagrada Familia on 28 September 1986 against Cartaginés and scored his first goal on 4 January 1987 against Limonense. In Costa Rica's first division, he played for Deportivo Saprissa, where he won three national championships and the 1993 CONCACAF Champions Cup. After three years at Saprissa he played in several different leagues worldwide, including Serie A of Italy (Foggia Calcio), the Yugoslav First League (Dinamo Zagreb), the Austrian Bundesliga (SK Rapid Wien), La Liga in Spain playing for Rayo Vallecano, and the Mexican Primera Division, with Pachuca, León and Necaxa. Pachuca decided to retire Medford's number 17 after he scored his 100th goal in his career.

International
Medford was part of the 1985 FIFA U-16 World Championship held in China, the first FIFA World Cup tournament where Costa Rica ever appeared, and scored the first goal ever for his home country in this type of tournaments. He made his senior debut for Costa Rica in a February 1987 friendly match against South Korea and earned a total of 89 caps, scoring 18 goals. He represented his country in 37 FIFA World Cup qualification matches and played in two World Cups, Italy 1990 and Japan-Korea 2002. He scored a goal against Sweden in the 1990 World Cup, which resulted in qualification for the second round. He also scored the winning goal at the Azteca Stadium against Mexico in the qualification for the 2002 FIFA World Cup. The match, known as the Aztecazo, is one of only two World Cup qualifiers that Mexico have ever lost on home soil. He also played at the 1995 UNCAF Nations Cup as well as at the 1991, 2000, and 2002 CONCACAF Gold Cups and the 1997 and 2001 Copa Américas. His final international was a June 2002 FIFA World Cup match against Turkey.

International goals
Scores and results list Costa Rica's goal tally first.

Managerial career
After retiring from professional football in 2003, he entered coaching. He first coached Deportivo Saprissa with great success, where he has won several championships, including 2 national tournaments, the Uncaf Cup and the CONCACAF Champions Cup, giving Saprissa the right to compete in the second FIFA Club World Championship Toyota Cup in Japan, in December 2005, in which Saprissa finished 3rd.

As of October 28, 2006, the Costa Rican Football Federation, or Federación Costarricense de Fútbol, announced him as the new head coach for the Costa Rica national football team. He was sacked on 28 June 2008 after a string of poor results and only a few wins, and showing unprecedent bias in favor of his old former players of Saprissa.

He took the reins of Club León for the Clausura 2009 season. His first game as head coach was against Tampico Madero, ending in a 1–1 tie. He was fired as manager by the president of the club owing to poor results in the pre-season and the season itself.

After leaving Club León Medford decided to take a break in coaching and decided to work as an administrator/manager but he was appointed manager of Liberia Mía in December 2009. In 2010 Hernan Medford signed with Limón, a club team from the province of Limon. He signed also as an administrator. The team seemed to have benefited from his previous experience as administrator. In June 2011 Carlos Pascal the team’s chairman was arrested due to accusations of drug trafficking leaving the club without a president. Medford tried to help the team survive this set back since without Pascal the team was left without financial support. Medford endured a difficult season with Limon F.C. In August 2011 Medford resigned, claiming it had nothing to do with the financial problems the club had suffered, but because of personal decisions. He took charge of Guatemalan side Xelajú in September 2011.

In May 2013, he was unveiled as the new manager of Honduran giants Real España. Under his direction Real España became the 2013 champion of the Honduran league. In July 2014 Medford was appointed the new national team manager of Honduras, leaving the post later in December due to the poor performance of the team during his tenure.

Personal life
Medford is a son of Herman Medford Sterling and Gloria Bryan Givans and has two sisters. He is married to Arlene Lewis and they have two daughters themselves.

Honours
Source:

Player
Pachuca
Primera División A: 1995–96

Rapid Wien
Austrian Cup runner-up: 1990–91

Rayo Vallecano
Segunda División runner-up: 1991–92

Saprissa
Primera División: 1988, 1989, 1993–94
CONCACAF Champions' Cup: 1993

Costa Rica
CONCACAF Championship: 1989
CONCACAF Gold Cup runner-up: 2002

Manager
Herediano
Liga FPD: 2016 Verano, 2017 Verano; runner-up: 2016 Invierno, 2017 Apertura

Real España
Honduran Liga Nacional: 2013 Apertura

Saprissa
Primera División: 2003–04, 2005–06; runner-up: 2004–05
CONCACAF Champions' Cup: 2005; runner-up: 2004
FIFA Club World Championship third place: 2005
UNCAF Interclub Cup: 2003; runner-up: 2004

Xelajú
Guatemalan Liga Nacional: 2012 Clausura

Costa Rica
UNCAF Nations Cup: 2007

References

External links
 
 Hernán Medford at Footballdatabase

1968 births
Living people
Footballers from San José, Costa Rica
Association football forwards
Costa Rican footballers
Costa Rica international footballers
Costa Rica youth international footballers
1990 FIFA World Cup players
1991 CONCACAF Gold Cup players
1997 Copa América players
2001 Copa América players
2000 CONCACAF Gold Cup players
2002 CONCACAF Gold Cup players
2002 FIFA World Cup players
Deportivo Saprissa players
GNK Dinamo Zagreb players
SK Rapid Wien players
Rayo Vallecano players
Calcio Foggia 1920 players
C.F. Pachuca players
Club León footballers
Club Necaxa footballers
Liga FPD players
Yugoslav First League players
Austrian Football Bundesliga players
La Liga players
Serie A players
Liga MX players
Costa Rican expatriate footballers
Expatriate footballers in Mexico
Expatriate footballers in Austria
Expatriate footballers in Spain
Expatriate footballers in Italy
Expatriate footballers in Yugoslavia
Costa Rican football managers
Deportivo Saprissa managers
Deportivo Saprissa non-playing staff
Costa Rica national football team managers
Real C.D. España managers
Club Xelajú MC managers
Honduras national football team managers
Expatriate football managers in Guatemala
Expatriate football managers in Honduras
Costa Rican expatriate sportspeople in Mexico
Costa Rican expatriate sportspeople in Austria
Costa Rican expatriate sportspeople in Spain
Costa Rican expatriate sportspeople in Italy
Costa Rican expatriate sportspeople in Yugoslavia
C.S.D. Municipal managers